The 1992 CONCACAF U-16 Tournament was a North American international association football tournament, it determined the 1993 FIFA U-17 World Championship entrants from the CONCACAF region. The 1992 edition of the competition was held in Cuba.

Group A

Group B

Group C

Final round

Canada, Mexico and USA qualified to the 1993 FIFA U-17 World Championship in Japan.

CONCACAF Under-17 Championship
Under
International association football competitions hosted by Cuba
1992 in youth association football
1992 in Cuban sport